Callianassa can refer to: 

Callianassa, one of the Nereids
Callianassa (genus), a genus of mud-shrimp including 
C. filholi
C. subterranea
C. tyrrhena (now known as Pestarella tyrrhena)